Evan Alfred Evans (March 19, 1876 – July 7, 1948) was a United States circuit judge of the United States Court of Appeals for the Seventh Circuit.

Education and career

Born in Spring Green, Wisconsin, Evans received a Bachelor of Arts degree from the University of Wisconsin–Madison in 1897 and a Bachelor of Laws from the University of Wisconsin Law School in 1899. He then practiced law in Baraboo, Wisconsin from 1900 to 1916.

Federal judicial service

Evans was nominated by President Woodrow Wilson on May 1, 1916, to a seat on the United States Court of Appeals for the Seventh Circuit vacated by Judge William Henry Seaman. He was confirmed by the United States Senate on May 10, 1916, and received his commission the same day. He was a member of the Conference of Senior Circuit Judges (now the Judicial Conference of the United States) from 1935 to 1947. His service terminated on July 7, 1948, due to his death. He was the last appeals court judge who continued to serve in active service appointed by President Wilson.

References

Sources
 

1876 births
1948 deaths
People from Spring Green, Wisconsin
University of Wisconsin–Madison alumni
University of Wisconsin Law School alumni
Judges of the United States Court of Appeals for the Seventh Circuit
United States court of appeals judges appointed by Woodrow Wilson
20th-century American judges